Al-Asharah (also spelled al-Ashareh or Esharah) is a town in eastern Syria, administratively part of the Deir ez-Zor Governorate, located along the Euphrates River, south of Deir ez-Zor. Nearby localities include al-Quriyah to the northeast, Makhan and Mayadin to the north, Suwaydan Jazirah to the southeast and Dablan to the south. According to the Syria Central Bureau of Statistics, al-Asharah had a population of 17,537 in the 2004 census. It is the administrative seat of a nahiyah ("subdistrict") which consists of seven localities with a total population of 96,001 in 2004. Al-Asharah is the third largest locality in the nahiyah. Its inhabitants are predominantly Sunni Muslims. From Arabians Tribes of Tayy Al-Rahabi and Al Uqaydat.

History
Al-Asharah is built on the site of the ancient Aramean-Assyrian settlement of Terqa. A stele dated to 886 BCE honoring the victory of Assyrian king Tukulti-Ninurta II over the Arameans was found in al-Asharah. The stele is currently located in the National Museum of Aleppo. Terqa was the capital of the Neo-Assyrian kingdom of Khana and continued to develop until the end of the Bronze Age when its decline began. Excavations in al-Asharah revealed evidence that Terqa contained urban institutions and its inhabitants had exploited the area's soil for economic benefit.

In the mid-19th-century, it was noted by the Bombay Geographic Society that al-Asharah was a "little town" that consisted of an unorganized grouping of Arab huts and a population whose traditions suggested the place was ancient. From around that time until the dissolution of the Ottoman Empire in 1917, al-Asharah served as the center of a kaza ("district"), bearing its name, that was part of the larger Sanjak of Zor province. The kaza had two nawahi: al-Asharah and al-Busayrah.

In 1920, a meeting between officials and officers of the Sharifian Army and the nascent Kingdom of Syria was held in al-Asharah and hosted by Emir Faisal. There negotiations over the borders between Syria and Iraq were discussed and it was concluded the Abu Kamal would remain a part of the Deir ez-Zor province of Syria.

In the early 1960s al-Asharah was described as a small village built on an artificial mound where Terqa stood.

In Syrian civil war city was occupied by ISIL until Syrian army captured town in 27 November 2017.

References

Bibliography

Populated places in Mayadin District
Populated places on the Euphrates River
Towns in Syria